Kyriakos Dourekas (Greek: Κυριάκος Δουρέκας, born 23 May 1963) is the Director of Football at Nottingham Forest F.C.. He also serves on the club's Board of Directors.

Early life 
Dourekas was born on 23 May 1963 in Montreal, Quebec. His career in professional football began in the early 1990s. He first worked as IT manager for Olympiacos F.C., before progressing through to become team coordinator. He then held different management roles before taking on a director position in 2007 – a post he held for 11 years until he left for Nottingham.

Olympiacos F.C. 
Dourekas joined Olympiacos F.C. in 1993 and spent 25 years with the team in various positions with the most recent being Director of Team Operations. During this period, he has experienced multiple successful campaigns, including 19 league championships and 17 seasons in the UEFA Champions League. He worked alongside managers such as former FC Barcelona head coach Ernesto Valverde, recent AS Monaco FC manager Leonardo Jardim, and the current Fulham F.C. boss Marco Silva.

Transfer rumours 

In November 2018, transfer rumours linking Dourekas to Nottingham Forest F.C. started circulating the Greek press.

Nottingham Forest F.C. 
On 6 December 2018, Nottingham Forest F.C. officially announced that Kyriakos Dourekas has been appointed as the club's Director of Football. "Nottingham Forest are delighted to confirm that Kyriakos Dourekas has been appointed as the club's Director of Football. He has vast knowledge and experience of European football at an elite level" said part of the official statement.

Since joining Nottingham Forest, Dourekas played a key role in the club's promotion to the Premier League for the first time since 1999.

On March 24 2022, Nottingham Forest announced that Dourekas has been appointed onto the club's board of directors.

References

Additional sources 
 http://edoelos.blogspot.com/2018/06/blog-post_691.html
 https://www.djazairess.com/fr/lebuteur/42333
 https://www.protothema.gr/sports/article/655950/dourekas-milousan-gia-20-lepta-me-ton-ekprosopo-tis-aek-oi-diaitites/
 https://www.to10.gr/podosfero/europa-league/356146/o-koulis-dourekas-episkefthike-gipedo-tis-bernli-pics/

1963 births
Living people
Olympiacos F.C. managers
Nottingham Forest F.C. non-playing staff
Canadian soccer coaches